Lochmaeocles fasciatus is a species of beetle in the family Cerambycidae. It was described by Hippolyte Lucas in 1857. It is known from Brazil, Paraguay, and Argentina.

References

fasciatus
Beetles described in 1857